Ermanno Vallazza (6 May 1899, in Boca – 30 January 1978, in Boca) was an Italian cyclist.

Major results

1923
9th Giro di Lombardia
1925
3rd Giro di Lombardia
6th Giro d'Italia
1926
1st Coppa Placci
3rd Giro di Lombardia
4th Giro d'Italia
1927
4th Giro d'Italia
1928
3rd Giro della Romagna

References

1899 births
1978 deaths
Italian male cyclists
Sportspeople from the Province of Novara
Cyclists from Piedmont